Two for the Show is a double-live album by American progressive rock band Kansas, released in 1978. The album was reissued in remastered format on CD in 2008. Recorded over the course of the band's three previous tours in 1977 and 1978, it was Kansas' first live album. It was certified Gold and then Platinum shortly after its release.

One single, "Lonely Wind," was released from the album. The single version was edited to under 3 minutes, and included a small amount of the piano solo that precedes it on the album. It received a reasonable amount of airplay and rose to No. 60 on the pop charts. Record World called it "a characteristic Kansas ballad with a lush high harmony hook."

In addition, Kirshner Records issued a promotional album of edited selections from the release, entitled Kansas Mini Concert on the spine and label, and Two for the Show Special Limited Edition on the cover. It features "Lonely Wind," "Dust in the Wind," "Song for America," and "The Wall." The same songs appear on both sides, and the first side is unbanded, meaning there is no indication on the vinyl of where each song begins.  This promo album was issued with both a black and a white cover.

Track listing

Original 1978 LP version 

* "Closet Chronicles" was omitted from the original CD release due to time constraints but appears on the remastered version of The Best of Kansas released in 1999, and appears on the second CD of the remastered version of Two for the Show.

2008 remastered version 
The Two for the Show album was re-released as a 2-CD set to commemorate the 30th Anniversary of the album with a second disc of songs that did not appear on the original album (except "Closet Chronicles" which was included on the original vinyl, excluded from the original CD release, and appears here on the second CD along with the bonus material) and a 24-page booklet.

Disc One

Disc Two 

All of the bonus tracks were recorded at the time of the recording of the album but omitted from the original album for various reasons including time constraints. Different live versions of  "Bringing It Back," "Down the Road," "Cheyenne Anthem," and "Sparks of the Tempest" appeared as bonus tracks on the remastered versions of Kansas, Song for America, Leftoverture, and Point of Know Return respectively. A different, earlier live version of "Lonely Street" appears as a bonus track on the later recorded U.S. version Live at the Whiskey (a different live version of "Belexes" and "Journey from Mariabronn" appear as a single bonus track on the German version of this release, available on iTunes and Apple Music)

In 2010, Legacy released the Kansas entry in Legacy's Boxed Set series known as The Music of Kansas. The 3rd of 3 discs from this Boxed Set is culled entirely from the double CD version of this album, featuring live cuts from both the original and expanded release, marking the first compilation to feature any of the previously unreleased tracks. A 4 disc version of this release was also issued a year later.

Personnel 
Kansas
 Steve Walsh – keyboards, vocals
 Robby Steinhardt – violins, vocals
 Kerry Livgren – guitars, keyboards
 Rich Williams – guitars
 Dave Hope – bass
 Phil Ehart – percussion, drums

Production
 Kansas - producer, cover concept
 Davey Moiré - engineer
 Brad Aaron - associate engineer
 Dave Hewitt - Record Plant Mobile engineer
 George Marino - mastering at Sterling Sound, New York
 Tom Drennon - art direction and design
 Jim Barrett - illustration
 Raul Vega, Terry Ehart, Andy Freeberg, Darryl Pitt, Neal Preston - photography
2008 remastering

 Phil Ehart – producer
 Jeff Glixman - producer, mixing and mastering of the remastered edition
 Jeff Magid - remastered edition producer
 Zak Rizvi, John Andreas - remastered edition mixing
 Brian Fanning, Frank Tozour - sony PQ editing

Charts 
 

Album

Singles

Certifications

References 

Kansas (band) live albums
1978 live albums
Epic Records live albums